Georg Güßregen (Georg Güssregen) was born July 4, 1890. He was an SS Obersturmführer. He joined the Nazi Party on September 10, 1939. His SS Membership number was 222498. He had one party number: 3988326.

Service History 
Promoted to Oberscharführer October 1, 1939

Promoted to Hauptscharführer January 2, 1941

Promoted to Untersturmführer April 20, 1941

Promoted to Obersturmführer  November 9, 1944

Command 
Gross-Rosen concentration camp, 1941

Auschwitz, 1942

Flossenburg, 1943

References 

1890 births
SS-Obersturmbannführer
Auschwitz concentration camp personnel
Gross-Rosen concentration camp personnel
Flossenbürg concentration camp personnel
Year of death missing